Ricardo Pando Córdova (born 7 February 1964) is a Peruvian Fujimorist politician and dentist. He is a former Congressman representing Junín for the 2006–2011 term. Pando lost his seat in the 2011 elections when he ran for re-election under the Force 2011 party of the former president's daughter, Keiko.

Political career 
His first political experience was in the 1993 municipal elections when he was elected as provincial councilor of Tarma. In the 1995 municipal elections he tried to run for re-election, but was not re-elected.

In the 2006 elections, he was elected Congressman, representing the Junín Region for the 2006–2011 term. Pando belongs to the Fujimorist Alliance for the Future party. Pando lost his seat in the 2011 elections when he ran for re-election under the Force 2011 party of the former president's daughter, Keiko.

References

External links
Official Congressional Site

1964 births
Fujimorista politicians
Living people
Members of the Congress of the Republic of Peru
People from Lima